Bosut is a village located in the city of Sremska Mitrovica, Serbia. It is situated near the Bosut River, in the autonomous province of Vojvodina. As of 2011 census, it has a population of 971 inhabitants.

While returning early from Budapest-Rakos M/Y mission, town was bombed by 1 x 463rd BG Boeing B-17 on 27 June 1944 as a target of opportunity: 16 x 250 GP bombs dropped on the main highway / powerplant.

Name
In Serbian, the village is known as Bosut (Босут), in Croatian as Bosut, and in Hungarian as Boszut. There is also a river with the same name (see: Bosut River).

Historical population
 1961: 1,094
 1971: 1,284
 1981: 1,311
 1991: 1,149
 2002: 1,139
 2011: 971

See also
 List of places in Serbia
 List of cities, towns and villages in Vojvodina

References

 Slobodan Ćurčić, Broj stanovnika Vojvodine, Novi Sad, 1996.

Populated places in Syrmia
Sremska Mitrovica